Olderman is a Swedish surname. Notable people with the surname include:

Bob Olderman (1962–1993), American football player
Murray Olderman (1922–2020), American cartoonist and sportswriter

Swedish-language surnames